Linnea Marie Torstensson (born 30 March 1983) is a Swedish handballer who played for the Sweden national team. She competed in three Olympic Games (2008, 2012 & 2016).

She was given the award of Cetățean de onoare ("Honorary Citizen") of the city of Bucharest in 2016.

International honours
EHF Champions League:
Winner: 2016
Bronze Medalist: 2017
EHF Cup Winners' Cup:
Winner: 2014
EHF Cup:
Winner: 2011
Bucharest Trophy:
Winner: 2014, 2015
European Championship:
Silver Medalist: 2010
Bronze Medalist: 2014
Carpathian Trophy: 
Winner: 2015

Awards and recognition
Most Valuable Player of the European Championship: 2010
 Handball-Planet.com Best Defensive Player: 2014
Swedish Female Handballer of the Year: 2010, 2011
 Prosport Best Defender of the Romanian Liga Națională: 2017

References

External links

  

1983 births
Living people
Handball players from Stockholm
Swedish female handball players
Olympic handball players of Sweden
Handball players at the 2008 Summer Olympics
Handball players at the 2012 Summer Olympics
Handball players at the 2016 Summer Olympics
Expatriate handball players
Swedish expatriate sportspeople in Denmark
Swedish expatriates in Slovenia
Swedish expatriate sportspeople in Romania
Swedish expatriates in France
Viborg HK players